The Lemhi Reservation was a United States Indian Reservation for the Lemhi Shoshone from 1875 to 1907. During almost all this time their main chief was Tendoy.

The group of about 700 that the reservation was formed for in 1875 also included Sheepeater Indians and Bannocks. Tendoy himself had one Lemhi Shoshone and one Bannock parent.

On February 12, 1875, President Grant established a 100 square mile executive order reservation for Sacagawea / Sacajawea's People the Lemhi Shoshone in the Lemhi Valley. Known as the Lemhi Valley Indian Reservation, the executive order established the reserve for "the exclusive use of the mixed tribes of Shoshone, Bannock, and Sheapeater Indians. Almost from the outset, however, the government and local residents began efforts to rescind the executive order reservation. They ultimately succeeded in 1905, and in 1907 the Lemhi began what many have called the "Lemhi Trail of Tears," which saw their forced removal from their ancestral homelands to the Fort Hall Indian Reservation.

Historical significance of the Lemi Shoshone in the area
Banished from their homeland in 1907 and seeking to return ever since, the Lemhi-Shoshone people create a dilemma for the nation. As it prepares to commemorate the Bicentennial of the Lewis and Clark Corps of Discovery, the United States needs to reassess its commitment to the Lemhi-Shoshone, to Sacagawea / Sacajawea's people. The obligation the nation acknowledges toward wolf and salmon recovery efforts is dwarfed by the responsibility it faces in treating fairly the people who played such a crucial role in advancing the success of the Lewis and Clark Expedition. In August 1805, Lewis and Clark and their Corps of Discovery approached the Three Forks of the Missouri River. At Fort Mandan in October 1804, they had acquired the services of Toussaint Charbonneau and one of his wives, Sacajawea, a fifteen-year-old "Shoshone" woman who was six months pregnant. The expedition valued Charbonneau and Sacajawea for their skills as interpreters—he for his French and she for her Hidatsa and Shoshone. Sacajawea, along with several other Shoshone girls, had been captured by a Hidatsa raiding party near the Three Forks four years earlier. Living at Fort Mandan, Charbonneau won Sacajawea in a wager with Hidatsa warriors. Lewis and Clark recognized the importance of being accompanied by someone who spoke the language of one of the tribes living in the Rocky Mountains in the vicinity of the Three Forks.

By the time Lewis and Clark reached the Three Forks of the Missouri River, they understood the critical need for obtaining horses from the Shoshones living just to the west, and they recognized as well the need to obtain geographical information necessary for crossing into the Columbia River drainage. The role of Sacajawea loomed large indeed. First Lewis and then Clark together with Sacajawea, the expedition met and established friendly relations with the Shoshones. They shared food and presents, and they smoked a pipe with the people under the leadership of Cameahweit, later revealed to be Sacajawea's brother. Shortly thereafter, Lewis and Clark assessed the Salmon River as too wild to carry them to the Columbia so they discussed with Cameahweit how best to cross the mountains to the land of the Nez Perce. Cameahweit provided them with a guide, Old Toby, and the "expedition bartered for about thirty horses to convey their goods across the mountains. With Old Toby's assistance, the Corps of Discovery finally reached the Nez Perce villages in late September of 1805. Historian Stephen Ambrose placed a high value on the role Sacajawea's people played. "Without Shoshone horses, without Shoshone information," he explained, "the expedition might as well turn around and go home.

The tribal people living in the Lemhi and Pahsimeroi valleys and along the Salmon River in 1805 were comprised initially of two groups. They included the Agaidika, or Salmoneaters, the Tukukika, or the Sheepeaters who lived in the surrounding mountains. These people subsisted by digging camas, fishing for salmon, and hunting mountain sheep, deer, antelope, and buffalo. As such, they exhibited the classic characteristic of Plateau Indian culture. The two groups subsisting in the Salmon River Country were an organized tribe that crossed the Bitterroots to hunt buffalo north and west of Yellowstone, traveled to the Camas Prairie near Nez Perce country, and traveled north to trade with their allies, the Flatheads. Sometime after 1805, perhaps in the 1850s, the Salmoneaters and Sheepeaters were joined by a number of Bannock Indians who came north from Fort Hall where the main Bannock tribe resided. These Bannock people, numbering about one hundred, became absorbed into the Lemhi tribe living in the Salmon River country.

Mormon missionaries who came to the Salmon River Valley in 1855 were the first non-Indians to establish a sustained relationship with the Salmon River Indian people. Approximately twenty-seven Mormon men left the Salt Lake Valley on May 18, 1855. The party reached Fort Lemhi on May 27, and they selected a permanent site for their mission on June 15, 1855. The mission, named Fort Lemhi, was located approximately two miles north of present-day Tendoy, Idaho. The word "Lemhi" was associated with King Limhi who was one of the kings cited in the Book of Mormon. In Mormon scripture, King Limhi organized an expedition that lasted twenty- two days—the same duration it required the Mormon missionaries to reach the Salmon River Country. Consequently, they named their mission after King Limhi, and, in time, Limhi became Lemhi.

(7)The Mormon mission enjoyed some success, especially after the Lemhi leader, Snag, became a convert to Mormonism, and his acceptance of Mormon doctrine sparked as many as 100 baptisms among the Lemhi people.

Ultimately, however, unrest among some Bannocks, Nez Perces, and the mission led to violence. In February 1858, two hundred Shoshone and Bannock warriors attacked the mission, killing two missionaries and making off with stolen cattle and horses. The mission closed its doors on March 26, 1858.

References

 Federal website on the area of the reservation
 article mentioning formation of the Lemhi Reservation
 Idaho Statesman, February 16, 1996. 
 Kappler 839 
 Idaho Statesman, February 16, 1996. 
 Stephen E. Ambrose, Undaunted Courage, Meriwether Lewis, Thomas Jefferson, and the Opening of the American West (New York: Simon & Schuster, 1996), 187. 
 Ambrose, Undaunted Courage, 259-285, 289-301. 
 Shoshone Tribe of Indians of the Wind River Reservation v. The United States of America, Ind. Cl. Comm. 387-413 (1962). Brigham D. Madsen, The Bannock of Idaho (Caldwell, Idaho: Caxton Printers, 1958), 170, 196-97. 
 Dorothy Clapp Robinson, "Fort Lemhi Mission, Idaho: Chapter in Review," Relief Society Magazine (September 1946): 583. 
 John D. Nash, "The Salmon River Mission of 1855: A Reappraisal," Idaho Yesterdays 11 (Spring 1967): 26; Merrill d. Beal, "Brigham Young's Indian Policy," A History of Southeastern Idaho (Caldwell, ill: The Caxton Printers, Ltd., 1942), 139. 
 Salmon River Mission Journal, February 24, 1858; Beal, Southeastern Idaho, 144-149; Nash, "Salmon River," 30-31. 
 The Fort Bridger Treaty of July 3, 1868, 15 Stat. 673, II Kappler 1020; Idaho Statesman, June 26, 1877. 
 The Unratified Treaty with the Shoshones, Bannacks, and Sheepeaters, September 24, 1868, 5 Kappler 707. 
 Kappler 839; Commissioner of Indian Affairs Annual Report, 1875,45-46,89. 
 "C.I.A Annual Report," 1880,278; Shirley Stephens, "The Lemhi Indian People of Idaho: Removal from the Salmon River Country to Fort Hall, 1880–1907," (M.A. thesis, Washington State University, 1996), 15-18. 
 Stephens, "The Lemhi People of Idaho," 95-105, 173-174, 177. 
 Ethel Kimball, "The Vanishing Americans Along the River of No Return," Real West, May 1975, Vertical File, Idaho History: Native American Lemhi Shoshone, Salmon Public Library, Salmon, Idaho. 
 Marcia Babcock Montgomery, "The Struggle to Retain Tribal Identity: The Lemhi Indian People of Idaho, 1907–1929," (M.A. thesis, Washington State University, 1996),93-96. 
 Unidentified reporter, newspaper article, 1938, File 354, Indians, Idaho, University of Idaho Special Collections, University of Idaho, Moscow. 
 Susie Bennet, "The Village That Once Was, " Patchwork: Pieces of Local History, Salmon High School, (May 1989) 
 Resolution of the Fort Hall Business Council of Shoshone Bannock Tribes, Number 211, December 7, 1951, Central Classified Files 054, Fort Hall, File 39977, Box 220, Accession 56A- 588, Record Group 75, National Archives. 
 John W.W. Mann, "Returning To The River Of No Return: The Lemhi Indian People and the Salmon River Country, Idaho, 1945–1972," (M.A. thesis, Washington State University, 1997.) Chapter 2. 
 Fort Hall Business Council Resolution 4431 (Sharing Resolution), January 30, 1971.

1875 establishments in Idaho Territory
American Indian reservations in Idaho
Native American history of Idaho
Former American Indian reservations